Passan  is a village in Kapurthala district of Punjab State, India. The village is administrated by a Sarpanch who is an elected representative.

Demography
According to the 2011 Census of India, Passan had 10 houses with total population of 62 persons of which 32 were male and 30 female. The literacy rate was 45.10%, lower than the state average of 75.84%.  The population of children in the age group 0–6 years was 11 and the child sex ratio was approximately 1200, higher than the state average of 846.

Air travel connectivity 
The closest airport to the village is Sri Guru Ram Dass Jee International Airport.

Villages in Kapurthala

References

External links
  Villages in Kapurthala
 Kapurthala Villages List

Villages in Kapurthala district